Lisa Le Feuvre is a curator, writer, editor and public speaker. In 2017 she was appointed the inaugural Executive Director of Holt/Smithson Foundation, an artist endowed foundation that aims to continue the creative and investigative legacies of the artists Nancy Holt and Robert Smithson.

Focusing on art as a powerful force to retune perceptions, Le Feuvre's research takes the form of exhibitions, publications, collections and public lectures. Committed to communicating and testing ideas, she has curated exhibitions in museums and galleries across Europe, published her writings in international publications and journals, spoken in museums and universities across the world, and has played a pivotal role in shaping academic and arts organizations. 

Between 2010 and 2017 Le Feuvre was Head of Sculpture Studies at the Henry Moore Institute, a part of the Henry Moore Foundation. She led a program of education, research, publications and exhibitions, and the development of the Leeds sculpture and collection archive. Previously Le Feuvre taught on the post-graduate Curatorial Program at Goldsmiths College, led the contemporary art program at the National Maritime Museum and was Course Director of the post-graduate program in Arts Policy and Management at Birkbeck College, University of London.  She has sat on various juries including Sculpture Dublin (2021), Arnaldo Pomodoro Foundation Prize (2019),the Turner Prize (2018), Hepworth Prize for Sculpture (2016), British representation at the Venice Biennale (2015), the Max Mara Prize for Women (2013), and co-curated the quinquennial exhibition British Art Show 7: In the Days of the Comet (2009-10).

Life and early career 

Le Feuvre was born in Guernsey, Channel Islands, emigrating to the UK in her mid-teens, first to the south of England. Three years later she moved to London to study Social Sciences, followed by Architecture, Arts Management, and Visual Cultures.

She started her work as a curator at The Photographers’ Gallery, initiating an innovative program of talks, events, and film screenings as well as curating exhibitions including 'Mediterranean: Between Reality and Utopia', 'Donovan Wylie: The Maze' (with Magnum Photographs), 'Pierre Bourdieu: In Algeria: Testimonies of Uprooting' (with Camera Austria), and 'Hashem El Madani: Studio Practices' (with Akram Zataari), which won the 2005 the John Kobal Photography Book Prize. In the early 2000s she co-initiated the experimental exhibition and performance space Hoxton Distillery in east London, between 2002 and 2003 was Curator of Public Programs at Tate Britain, and from 2003 to 2005 co-ordinated the Parknights series of talks, discussions, and films at the Serpentine Gallery.

Through the 2000s Le Feuvre was based in academia. Until 2004 she was Course Director of the postgraduate program in Arts Policy and Management at Birkbeck College, London and then taught on the postgraduate Curatorial Program at Goldsmiths, University of London. In addition she contributed to the MA in Contemporary Art at Sotheby’s Institute, BA Arts Management at London Southbank University, and the Foundation in Art and Design at Chelsea School of Art, London. She continues to examine doctoral research and deliver guest lectures to international art schools and universities.

Le Feuvre lives in London, UK and New Mexico, USA. She is married to the artist Oswaldo Maciá.

Curatorial projects and institutional Leadership 

Le Feuvre has curated more than sixty exhibitions, as an institutional and independent curator. 

In 2010-11 she curated (with Tom Morton) the seventh edition of the British Art Show, the quinquennial survey exhibition; titled In the Days of the Comet it was presented in Nottingham (Nottingham Contemporary, Nottingham Castle Museum and New Art Exchange), London (Hayward Gallery), Glasgow (CCA, Tramway, Gallery of Modern Art, Glasgow) and across four venues in Plymouth.

At the National Maritime Museum, Greenwich she directed the directing the New Visions contemporary art program between 2005 and 09. Her program invited artists to develop new work in response to the social-political histories of the sea, ships, stars, and time. She worked with Renée Green, Dan Holdsworth, Jeremy Millar, Simon Patterson, Esther Shalev-Gerz, and Lawrence Weiner. to develop expansive exhibition projects.

Between 2010 and 2017 Le Feuvre was a member of the Strategic Management Team at the Henry Moore Foundation, leading the Henry Moore Institute. Running the research component of the largest artist foundation in Europe, she directed a programme of education, publications and exhibitions of the highest standard; led the Leeds Museums & Galleries Sculpture Collection and Archive, one of the strongest public collections of British sculpture; and sat on the Foundation's Grants Committee; oversaw a world-leading sculpture library and Research Fellowship program; edited the Institute’s publishing; and with liocal oartners initiated the Yorkshire Sculpture Triangle, which became Yorkshire Sculpture International. As well as supporting a team to develop a robust exhibition program, she led on exhibitions including Jiro Takamatsu: The Temperature of Sculpture (2017), Aleksandra Domanović: Votives  (2017) The Body Extended: Sculpture and Prosthetics (2016), Paul Neagu: Palpable Sculpture (2015), Katrina Palmer: The Necropolitan Line (2015), The Event Sculpture (2014), Ian Kiaer: Tooth House (2014)  Gego: Line as Object (2013), Robert Filliou: The Institute of Endless Possibilities (2013) Sarah Lucas: Ordinary Things (2012), and Mario Merz: What Is To Be Done? (2011). During her tenure Le Feuvre was instrumental in developing the vision and external profile of the Foundation, led by the core values of Henry Moore. While directing the Institute she raised the international profile of the Institute, initiated sustainable links with local communities and implemented effective business working practices, striving to create a new model for an artist foundation.

In 2017 she was invited to be the first Executive Director of Holt/Smithson Foundation, an artist-endowed foundation dedicated to the creative legacies of the artists Nancy Holt (1938-2014) and Robert Smithson (1938-73).  Holt/Smithson Foundation is a new model of artist-endowed foundation in this growing sector of the arts ecology. Collaborating with artists, writers, thinkers, and institutions, Holt/Smithson Foundation realizes exhibitions, published books, initiates artist commissions, programs educational events, encourages research, and develops collections globally from its headquarters in New Mexico.

Writing, editing, public speaking  

Le Feuvre’s editorial work includes the Henry Moore Institute’s journal ‘Essays on Sculpture', and the Institute’s publication program between 2010 and 2017;[23] the MIT Press compilation 'Failure' in the MIT / Whitechapel Art Gallery’s 'Documents on Contemporary Art' series and the second issue of 'NOIT,' the journal of John Latham's Flat Time House, on the topic of burning.

Since 2000 Le Feuvre has contributed to art journals and written extensively in publications on topics that include prosthetics, sculpture and failure. Since 2017 she has written on artists including Auguste Rodin (2021, Tate Modern, London), Kiki Smith (2021; Musée cantonal des Beaux-Arts de Lausanne), Mario Merz (2021 Hangar Bicocca, Milan), Eva Rothschild (2019, Ireland at Venice), Günther Förg (2018, Yale University Press), Michael Kienzer (2017, Gerhard Marcks Haus), and has published interviews with Thomas J. Price (2021,The Powerplant, Toronto), Christine Corday (2019, Contemporary Art Museum St Louis) and Emilia Kabakov (2017, Art Monthly, London).

Le Feuvre has delivered lectures at international museums, universities, and art schools including Centre for the Humanities, Graduate Center, City of New York University; Dia Art Foundation; Galleria Nazionale d'Arte Moderna, Rome; ICA, London; Muzeum Sztuki, Łódź, Poland; Periferico Centro Arte Contemporanea, Caracas, Venezuela; Sabanci University, Istanbul, Turkey; Tate, London; and University of Queensland Art Gallery, Brisbane.

References

Living people
1950 births